Fido was a sailing ship built in Norway in 1876. She was wrecked upon Red Head near Nine Mile Beach, New South Wales during a gale on 6 May 1898. Eleven people died.

References

1876 ships
Ships built in Norway
Shipwrecks of the Hunter Region
Barquentines of Australia
Maritime incidents in 1898
City of Lake Macquarie